The 1910 FA Charity Shield was the third Charity Shield, a football match contested by the winners of the previous season's Football League and Southern League competitions. The match was played on 5 September 1910 between 1909–10 Football League winners Aston Villa and 1909–10 Southern League champions Brighton and Hove Albion. The match was played at Stamford Bridge, London, and ended with a 1–0 win for Brighton and Hove Albion. The goal was scored by Charlie Webb, an amateur, with 18 minutes of play remaining.

In the five years that the Charity Shield was contested by the winners of the Football League and Southern League between 1908 and 1912, this was the only occasion on which the Southern League champions prevailed. The victory remains Brighton's only national honour to date and they were crowned the 'Champions of all England'.

Match details

References
 
 

FA Community Shield
Comm
Charity Shield 1910
Charity Shield 1910
Charity Shield
Charity Shield